The handball tournaments at the 2021 Islamic Solidarity Games in Konya occurred between 7 August and 14 August 2021. The handball competition took place at Selçuklu Municipality International Sports Hall in Konya. 4 teams in 2 groups played in a single round-robin system with a one-day interval between each other, and the group competitions were completed in the first 6 days. On Day 7, semi-finals are played an on day 8, the third place and final competitions were played. Group winners and runners-up were cross-matched in the quarter-finals A1-B2 and A2-B1, Winners compete for Gold, and losers for Bronze Medals.

The Games were originally scheduled to take place from 20 to 29 August 2021 in Konya, Turkey. In May 2020, the Islamic Solidarity Sports Federation (ISSF), who are responsible for the direction and control of the Islamic Solidarity Games, postponed the games as the 2020 Summer Olympics were postponed to July and August 2021, due to the global COVID-19 pandemic.

Medalists

Medal table

Men's tournament

Preliminary round
All times are local (UTC+3).

Group A

Group B

Knockout stage

Bracket

Semifinals

Fifth place game

Bronze medal game

Gold medal game

Women's tournament

Preliminary round

Group A

Group B

Knockout stage

Bracket

Semifinals

Seventh place game

Fifth place game

Bronze medal game

Gold medal game

Notes

References

External links 
Official website
Results

2021 Islamic Solidarity Games
2021
Islamic Solidarity Games
International handball competitions hosted by Turkey